Galkynysh is a presidential yacht  acquired by the Turkmenistan government in 2008, the first such boat in the Caspian Sea.

History
The vessel was designed by Stefano Natucci and built by the Benetti shipyard in Italy as Wind. In 2008, it was first used in the field meeting of the Cabinet of Ministers of Turkmenistan. The yacht sails the coast of the Caspian Sea.

References

External links
 Galkynysh Yacht Specification
 Galkynysh Yacht

Ships built in Italy
2007 ships
Motor yachts
Ships of Turkmenistan